Hastings Keith (November 22, 1915 – July 19, 2005) was a United States representative from Massachusetts.

Keith was born in Brockton, Massachusetts on November 22, 1915. He graduated from Brockton High School, Deerfield Academy, and the University of Vermont in 1938.  He performed graduate work at Harvard University.  He was a member of the faculty of the Boston University Evening College of Commerce.

In 1933, he was a student in the Citizens' Military Training Camps. He served as a battery officer in the Massachusetts National Guard.  During the Second World War, he served in the United States Army with eighteen months' overseas service in Europe. Keith was a graduate of the Command and General Staff School, and was a colonel in the US Army Reserve. He was a salesman and later district manager for the Equitable Life Assurance Society in Boston.  He was a member of the Massachusetts Senate, a partner in a general insurance firm in Brockton, and was an unsuccessful candidate for the Republican nomination for Congress in 1956.

He was elected as a Republican to the Eighty-sixth and to the six succeeding Congresses (January 3, 1959 – January 3, 1973).  On April 19, 1974 President Nixon appointed Hastings Keith of Massachusetts as a Member of the Defense Manpower Commission. He was not a candidate for reelection in 1972 to the Ninety-third Congress, but was a candidate for nomination in 1992 to the One Hundred Third Congress until he withdrew from the race. He died in Brockton on July 19, 2005.  He was buried at Union Cemetery in Brockton.

See also
 1953–1954 Massachusetts legislature
 1955–1956 Massachusetts legislature

References

External links

 Official Biography

1915 births
2005 deaths
University of Vermont alumni
Harvard University alumni
Boston University faculty
American Congregationalists
Republican Party Massachusetts state senators
Deerfield Academy alumni
Politicians from Brockton, Massachusetts
Military personnel from Massachusetts
Republican Party members of the United States House of Representatives from Massachusetts
United States Army personnel of World War II
20th-century American politicians
United States Army reservists
United States Army colonels
Massachusetts National Guard personnel